The Indonesia national rugby union team represents Indonesia in rugby union. They are nicknamed the "Rhinos". The team is a full member of World Rugby. They have yet to play in the Rugby World Cup. The Indonesian squad was formed in 2006 to attend the IRB sanctioned Six Division Asian Rugby Football Tournament between Brunei, Laos, Cambodia and Indonesia. They currently compete in Division 3 South-East in the Asian Rugby Football Union.

The national side is ranked 100th in the world (as of 6 June 2021).

History

Early Years (1975-1986)
Rugby was first introduced in Indonesia during the Dutch colonial period, and was played mostly by ex-pats.  In March 1976 an Indonesian Sevens squad, alongside twelve other nations, participated in the inaugural Hong Kong Sevens tournament. Indonesia returned to Hong Kong again for the 1976 tournament where they lost to Tonga in the plate final.  Indonesia continued to participate in the tournament until 1986 after which, interest began to wane and the program went on hiatus.

ARFU Division 6 (2004-2008)
In the early to mid 2000s, rugby made a resurgence in Indonesia. In 2004, the Indonesian Rugby Football Union was formed and on 27 June 2006 the first ever Indonesian XVs game was played against Cambodia during the first Division 6 ARFU regional tournament in Phnom Penh, Cambodia.  Indonesia would lose their début test match 30-7. In 2007, Singapore rugby's Ismail Kadir and Justin Sampson took over coaching duties. Later that year, the Rhinos returned once again to the Asian Division 6 Championships in Brunei, recording wins against Laos 17-3 and Cambodia 11-10.  Indonesia then went on to defeat tournament hosts Brunei 28-13, taking home the series as well as the Darussalam Cup.

In July 2008, the Rhinos won the HSBC a5n Regional Tournament, which was played at the Universitas Pelita Harapan, Jakarta, Indonesia. The Rhinos defeated Laos 23-11 and Cambodia 55-3 in front of an appreciative home crowd,.  The Rhinos finished their time in ARFU Division 6 with an impressive 88% Win–loss record (7 wins, 1 loss), thus earning a promotion Division 3.

ARFU Division 3 (2009- present)
In 2009, Indonesia's coaching staff of Kadir and Sampson was expanded to include former Wallabies player  
Duncan Hall, who had previously held the head coaching job for the USA national team. In July 2009, Indonesia made their debut in Division 3 at the 2009 Asian Five Nations. In the tournament, the Rhinos recorded two consecutive losses, falling 3-23 to Guam and 13-48 to Iran.

In the years that followed, Indonesia would lose three more matches in the upper tier division before finally posting their first win on 25 June 2011 against Pakistan 20-19 during the 2011 A5N divisional series in Jakarta.
 Following that win, Indonesia went on to win two of its next four matches, including a thumping win over China 37-13 in Malaysia in 2014.  A year later, the Rhinos would face China a second time in the 2014 A5n opener, losing a highly contested match by a four-point differential. Two days later, an 11-10 win against Laos would  secure a third-place finish in the series.

In 2015, the rebranded Asia Rugby Championship returned once again to Jakarta where Indonesia faced Guam in the series opener. This would mark Indonesia's first match at home since they defeated Pakistan  three years prior. The Rhinos would go winless in the series, first losing the opener to Guam and later China. In 2016 Indonesia would play just one test match against Loas, losing by a large margin, 12-48.

In 2019, the IRFU named former Rhinos veteran and captain Bobby Orlando as head coach for the 2019 Asia Rugby Championship series where Indonesia competed in the newly formed Division 3 South-East division along with India and China.  On June 23, Indonesia fell in the tournament opener to a strong Chinese side 63—10, with the Rhino's lone try coming from veteran captain Daniel Nugroho.

Current squad

2019 Asia Rugby Championships roster

Coaches and Captaincy

Current coaching staff

Previous head coaches

Team Captains

Records

Asian Rugby Championship record

Overall Test record by opponent

See also
 Rugby union in Indonesia

External links
Official site of the Indonesian Rugby Football Union  
Rugbydata
Jakarta Komodo Rugby Club 
Jakarta Banteng Rugby Club
Rugby in Asia Indonesia Homepage - Jakarta Banteng Rugby Club

References

 
Asian national rugby union teams
Rugby union in Indonesia